Elijah Mattison Sharp was a member of the Wisconsin State Assembly.

Biography
Sharp was born on October 21, 1832, in Reading, New York; he moved to Delavan, Wisconsin in 1850. On September 30, 1862, Sharp married Sarah A. Williams. They had seven children. Sharp died in 1891.

Career
Sharp was a member of the Assembly in 1872 and 1875. Other positions he held include Treasurer of Delavan and member of the Walworth County, Wisconsin Board of Supervisors. He was a Republican.

References

External links
RootsWeb

People from Schuyler County, New York
People from Delavan, Wisconsin
Republican Party members of the Wisconsin State Assembly
County supervisors in Wisconsin
City and town treasurers in the United States
1832 births
1891 deaths
Burials in Wisconsin
19th-century American politicians